Bustle is an online American women's magazine founded in August 2013 by Bryan Goldberg. It positions news and politics alongside articles about beauty, celebrities, and fashion trends. By September 2016, the website had 50 million monthly readers.

History

Bustle was founded by Bryan Goldberg in 2013. Previously, Goldberg co-founded the website Bleacher Report with a single million-dollar investment. He claimed that "women in their 20s have nothing to read on the Internet." Bustle was launched with $6.5 million in backing from Seed and Series A funding rounds.

It surpassed 10 million monthly unique visitors in July 2014, placing it ahead of rival women-oriented sites such as Refinery29, Rookie and xoJane; it had the second greatest number of unique visitors after Gawker's Jezebel.

By 2015, Bustle had 46 full-time editorial staff and launched the parenting sister site Romper. In September 2016, Bustle launched a redesign using the company's $11.5 million series D funding round. At that time, the site had over 70 full-time editors and 250 contract contributors who posted more than 200 articles daily.

In April 2019, Kate Ward resigned as editor-in-chief. Emma Rosenblum replaced Ward in June 2019.

Bustle Digital Group

Formation 
On April 17, 2017, DMG Media (publishers of the British tabloid The Daily Mail) announced that it had sold Elite Daily to the newly-rebranded Bustle Digital Group.

Sales and acquisitions 
Goldberg said that the acquisition was done in part to increase Bustle's original video content, which generated an average of 10 million monthly views, compared to Elite Daily's average of 60 million monthly views.

Bustle Digital Group purchased the inactive website Gawker in July 2018. Bustle Digital Group bought the events website Flavorpill, owner of Flavorwire, in August 2018. On Nov 29, 2018, Mic CEO Chris Altchek announced Mic was laying off most of Mic's staff while working on a deal to sell Mic. Later on Nov 29, a Bustle rep confirmed that Bustle Digital Group had acquired Mic.

In March 2019, Bustle Digital Group purchased The Outline, followed by The Zoe Report in May 2019. They also purchased Nylon in June 2019, with the intention to publish print magazines under the Nylon brand name. Rather than monthly publications, the magazines will be published around large cultural events, like the Coachella music festival. In July, Bustle Digital acquired Inverse, a science and culture site.

In 2021, BDG acquired Some Spider, parent of Scary Mommy and Fatherly.

References

External links

2013 establishments in New York (state)
American women's websites
Internet properties established in 2013
Magazines established in 2013
Magazines published in New York City
Online magazines published in the United States
Women's magazines published in the United States